The 2016–17 Princeton Tigers women's basketball team represented Princeton University during the 2016–17 NCAA Division I women's basketball season. The Tigers, led by tenth year head coach Courtney Banghart, played their home games at Jadwin Gymnasium as members of the Ivy League. The team was picked by the Ivy League in the pre-season to finish second in the conference. The team finished the season with a 16–14 overall, 9–5 Ivy record and appeared in the Women's National Invitation Tournament, where they lost to Villanova in the first round.

Previous season
The Tigers finished the 2015–16 season with a 23–6 overall record and 12–2 in the Ivy League. Their only two conference losses came against Pennsylvania, who won the season-ending championship game. The Tigers were an at-large selection to the NCAA tournament, notably becoming the first-ever Ivy League team to earn an at-large bid in either the men's or women's NCAA Tournament. However, they lost in the first round to West Virginia.

Ivy League changes
This season, the Ivy League instituted conference postseason tournaments. The tournaments only awarded the Ivy League automatic bids for the NCAA Division I Men's and Women's Basketball Tournaments; the official conference championships continue to be awarded based solely on regular-season results. The Ivy League playoff took place March 11 and 12 at the Palestra in Philadelphia. There were two semifinal games on the first day with No. 1 seed Penn playing No. 4 seed Cornell and No. 2 seed Princeton playing No. 3 seed Harvard. The final, ultimately between Penn and Princeton, was played the next day for the NCAA bid.

Roster

Schedule

|-
!colspan=8 style="background:#000000; color:#FF6F00;"| Regular season

|-
!colspan=8 style="background:#000000; color:#FF6F00;"| Ivy League regular season

|-
!colspan=8 style="background:#000000; color:#FF6F00;"| Ivy League Tournament

|-
!colspan=8 style="background:#000000;"| Women's National Invitation tournament

References

External links

Princeton
Princeton Tigers women's basketball seasons
Princeton Tigers women's
Princeton Tigers women's
2017 Women's National Invitation Tournament participants